The Center for Equal Opportunity (CEO) is an American conservative think tank, whose mission is to study, develop, and disseminate ideas that promote colorblind equal opportunity and nondiscrimination in America. CEO focuses on four policy areas: culture and society, education, employment, and government activity.

The founder and chairman of the Center for Equal Opportunity is Linda Chavez and the president and general counsel is Devon Westhill.

Since 1995, the Center for Equal Opportunity has released dozens of studies documenting the extent to which race is a factor in American college admissions at over 60 colleges and universities.

See also
 John M. Olin Foundation
 Gerald A. Reynolds
 Abigail Thernstrom
 John J. Miller
 Roger Clegg
 Equality of opportunity

References

External links
 Center For Equal Opportunity official site

Conservative organizations in the United States
English-only movement
Opposition to affirmative action
Think tanks based in the United States